Clorobiocin is an aminocoumarin antibacterial that inhibits the enzyme DNA gyrase.

References 

Antibiotics
Imidazoles